Javier is a surname of the following notable people:

Athletes
Al Javier (born 1954) Dominican baseball outfielder
Beethoven Javier (1947 – 2017), Uruguayan football player and coach
Chris Javier (born 1992), Filipino basketball player
Cristian Javier (born 1997), Dominican baseball pitcher for the Houston Astros
Julián Javier (born 1936), Dominican baseball second baseman
Kristian Javier (born 1996) American soccer player
Nelson Javier (born 1985), Dominican badminton player
Stan Javier (born 1964), Dominican baseball outfielder

Letters
Daniel Falcon Javier, Filipino teacher
Emil Q. Javier (born 1940), Filipino academic

Politicians
Evelio Javier (1942–1986), Filipino politician
Rogelio Rodríguez Javier (born 1958), Mexican politician

Arts
Danny Javier, Filipino entertainer
Dyords Javier, Filipino entertainer
Geraldine Javier Filipino artist
Jovany Javier, American entertainer
Mica Javier, Filipina singer

Other
León de Garro y Javier, Basque nobleman

See also

Amy Lazaro-Javier

Spanish-language surnames
Surnames of Spanish origin
Lists of people by surname